Machang may refer to:

Machang District, Kelantan, Malaysia
Machang (town)
Machang (federal constituency)
Machang, Anhui, a town in Quanjiao County, China
Machang, Puding County, a town in Guizhou, China
Machang, Qing County, a town in Hebei, China
Machang station, a subway station in Kaifu District, Changsha, Hunan, China
Zongzi, or machang, a rice dish